Balinese theatre and dramas include Janger dance, pendet dance performances and masked performances of Topèng. Performances are also part of funeral rituals involving a procession, war dance, and other rituals before the cremation of the patulangan.  Balinese use the word sesolahan for both theatre and dance.

Arja (dance), Balinese dance-opera
Barong dance performances  featuring Rangda, a dancer with keris, Jero Gede (black masked figures) and Jero Luh (white masked performers)
Barong Ket: lion barong, the most common Barong, it is the symbol of a good spirit.
Barong Landung: giant barong, the form is similar to Betawi Ondel-ondel
Barong Celeng: boar barong
Barong Macan: tiger barong
Barong Naga: dragon (or serpent) 
Gambuh, plays with chanting and music including the use of long flute like instruments
Topèng, masked theatre
Calonarang, performances at temples during times of danger or difficulty that involve stories 
Drama Gong, popular theatre developed in the late 1960s 
Sendratari, a group ballet form that emerged in the 1960s that includes a dhalang puppeteer giving dialogue and often a gamelan (orchestra), Sendratari or Kècak  chant

Javanese Wayang shadow plays are performed in Bali.

Gallery

See also
Balinese art
Balinese dance
Theatre of Indonesia
Folklore of Indonesia
Dance in Indonesia

References

Theatre in Indonesia
Balinese culture